Mavridis is a Greek surname. Notable people with the surname include:

Christos Mavridis (born 1998), Greek footballer
Kostas Mavridis (born 1962), Greek footballer
Nikolaos Mavridis (born 1973), Greek artificial intelligence researcher

Greek-language surnames
Surnames